Aleksei Sergeyevich Grechkin (born 5 February 1996) is a Russian football player. He plays for FC Chernomorets Novorossiysk.

Club career
He played his first game for the main squad of FC Rostov on 24 September 2015 in a Russian Cup game against FC Tosno.

References

External links
 

1996 births
People from Novopokrovsky District
Living people
Russian footballers
Russia youth international footballers
Association football defenders
FC Rostov players
FC Armavir players
FC Spartak Moscow players
FC Chernomorets Novorossiysk players
FC Chayka Peschanokopskoye players
Sportspeople from Krasnodar Krai